Daozhou or Dao Prefecture was a zhou (prefecture) in imperial China centering on modern Dao County, Hunan, China. In the Yuan dynasty it was known as Daozhou Route and in the Ming dynasty (briefly) as Daozhou Prefecture. It existed (intermittently) from 634 to 1913.

Geography
The administrative region of Daozhou in the Tang dynasty falls within modern Yongzhou in southern Hunan. It probably includes modern:
Dao County
Jiangyong County
Ningyuan County
Xintian County
Jianghua Yao Autonomous County

References
 

Prefectures of the Tang dynasty
Jinghu South Circuit
Prefectures of the Yuan dynasty
Prefectures of the Ming dynasty
Subprefectures of the Ming dynasty
Former prefectures in Hunan
Departments of the Qing dynasty
Prefectures of Ma Chu
Prefectures of Southern Han
Populated places established in the 7th century
634 establishments
1913 disestablishments in China